Nanna Magdalene Liebmann (September 27, 1849 – May 11, 1935) was a Danish, music educator, music critic, concert promoter and composer. She studied at The Royal Danish Academy of Music with Victor Bendix, Johann Christian Gebauer, J.P.E. Hartmann, Niels W. Gade, August Winding and Carl Helsted. At the conservatory she met composer Axel Liebmann, whom she married in 1874. He died soon afterward and she turned to composing and teaching music to support herself and her child. Most of her compositions are written between 1869 and 1914, and she wrote reviews for Dannebrog.

Notable works
Selected works include:
Syv sange til tyske tekster 1885
Syv sange 1885
Minnelieder 1903
Fem sange 1904
Thema med Variationer (klaver 1910)
Thème passioneè (klaver 1910)
Théme passionné et Variations (1911)
Intermezzo i h-mol (klaver 1911)
Vals i D (klaver 1912)
Preludium i a-mol (klaver 1912)

See also
List of Danish composers

References
This article was initially translated from the Danish Wikipedia.

1849 births
1935 deaths
19th-century classical composers
20th-century classical composers
Danish classical composers
Danish music educators
Women classical composers
Women music educators
Danish women composers
20th-century Danish composers
19th-century Danish composers
20th-century women composers
19th-century women composers
Burials at the Garrison Cemetery, Copenhagen